Mompha idaei is a moth in the family Momphidae first described by Philipp Christoph Zeller in 1839. It has a Holarctic distribution; in North America it is found from coast to coast in the boreal forest south to Colorado and Washington.

The wingspan is 18–22 mm. Adults are on wing in May to July. The larvae live in the roots of Epilobium angustifolium and Epilobium latifolium.

References

External links
Lepidoptera of Belgium
Image

Momphidae
Moths of Asia
Moths of Europe
Moths of North America
Moths described in 1839
Taxa named by Philipp Christoph Zeller